Miscellaneous Symbols and Pictographs is a Unicode block containing meteorological and astronomical symbols, emoji characters largely for compatibility with Japanese telephone carriers' implementations of Shift JIS, and characters originally from the Wingdings and Webdings fonts found in Microsoft Windows.

Emoji

The block contains 637 emoji and has 312 standardized variants defined to specify emoji-style (U+FE0F VS16) or text presentation (U+FE0E VS15) for 156 base characters.

Emoji modifiers

The Miscellaneous Symbols and Pictographs contains a set of "Emoji modifiers" which are modifier characters intended to represent skin colour based on the Fitzpatrick scale (but conflating the two lightest skin types into one category):

 
 
 
 
 

These emoji modifiers can be used on emojis that represent people or body parts including the 54 human emojis in the Miscellaneous Symbols and Pictograph block.

In August 2014, Peter Edberg of Apple Inc. and Mark Davis of Google proposed implementing these "emoji modifiers" to provide better representation of "human diversity" in emoji characters.
 and, in June 2015, the proposal was adopted in Unicode version 8.0.
This was the result of lobbying by Katrina Parrott, whose daughter came up with the idea after being unable to send emojis that looked like her.

To modify an emoji representing a human or body part, the emoji modifier must be placed immediately after that emoji.  When the emoji modifier is applied to an emoji, the emoji-style variant selectior (U+FE0F) should be omitted because the emoji modifier automatically implies emoji-style presentation.

Table of emojis with modifiers
The following table shows the full combinations of each of the five modifiers with all the "human emoji" characters in the Miscellaneous Symbols and Pictographs block. Each character should show in each of the five skin tones provided a suitable font is installed on the system and the rendering software is capable of handling modifier characters. Platforms without emoji modifier support may show as boxes.

Additional human emoji can be found in other Unicode blocks: Dingbats, Emoticons, Miscellaneous Symbols, Supplemental Symbols and Pictographs, Symbols and Pictographs Extended-A and Transport and Map Symbols.

Chart

History
The following Unicode-related documents record the purpose and process of defining specific characters in the Miscellaneous Symbols and Pictographs block:

References 

Unicode blocks
Emoji